Sergio Gámiz Chasco (born 26 February 1978 in Vitoria-Gasteiz, Álava) is a Spanish retired footballer who played as a defensive midfielder.

External links
 
 Futbolme profile 

1978 births
Living people
Footballers from Vitoria-Gasteiz
Spanish footballers
Association football midfielders
Deportivo Alavés players
CD Badajoz players
CD Leganés players
SD Ponferradina players
CF Badalona players
Logroñés CF footballers
CD Alcoyano footballers
CD Mirandés footballers